Aridhu Aridhu is a 2010 Indian Tamil-language drama film written and directed by K. R. Mathivanan, an assistant of director Shankar, directing his maiden venture. The movie is produced by Jaya Krishnan under the banner name of JK Creations. The movie's lead cast includes Harish Kalyan and  Uttara Raj, making her debut. Thaman has scored the music under the audio label of Five Star Audios.

Cast
The names of the characters are not mentioned in the film.

 Harish Kalyan as the son
 Uttara Raj
 Abdul Hakeem
 Harihar Raj as the father
 Vatsan Chakravarthy

Production 
Uttara, who won a New Zealand beauty pageant was signed to play the lead actress while Princess Jasmine (acted in the Hollwood film Ghost Rider) was signed to play a supporting role.

Soundtrack

The music of the film, composed by Thaman was released at Sathyam Cinemas, Chennai. Director Shankar released the audio in the event which also saw other prominent directors such as Thankar Bachan, Vetrimaaran, Lingusamy and Perarasu, producers R.B. Choudhary, Kalaipuli Dhanu and executive members of TFPC.
The lyrics are written by the director K. R. Mathivanan himself.

References

External links
 
 http://aridhuaridhu.com/

2010 films
2010s Tamil-language films
Films scored by Thaman S